Sirajul Islam is Bangladeshi historian, writer, columnist, professor and academician. He is the chairman of the Board of Editors of Banglapedia, the national encyclopedia of Bangladesh, and the editor of the Journal of the Asiatic Society of Bangladesh. He is also famous for his works on agriculture, British era land tenure and social history of Bengal.

Career
Sirajul Islam served as a professor of history department at the University of Dhaka. He gave up his day job five years before the formal date of retirement, to make time for Banglapedia, in 2000.

A corresponding fellow of the Royal Historical Society, Islam was a Senior Commonwealth Staff Fellow at the University of London (1978–79), a Senior Fulbright Scholar at Urbana-Champaign (1990–91), and a British Academy Visiting Professor (2004).

Work
In 2002, 10 volumes of Banglapedia, published by Asiatic Society, came out in his editorship. In 1991, 3 volumes of the History of Bangladesh (political, economic and socio-cultural), published by Asiatic Society, came out in his editorship. For the society, he is working on the Children’s Banglapedia and the Cultural Survey of Bangladesh. He also is in charge of the National Online Biography project of the society and the Banglapedia Trust.

During his 34-year-long stint at the university, he wrote major seminal works like Permanent Settlement in Bengal (1978), The Bengal Land Tenure (1990) and the Rural History of Bangladesh (1990). He also edited the 4 volume Bangladesh District Record Survey.

References

Living people
Academics of the University of London
Place of birth missing (living people)
Date of birth missing (living people)
Academic staff of the University of Dhaka
Year of birth missing (living people)